Mavelikara railway station (Code: MVLK) is a railway station (NSG 5 Category) in Alappuzha district, Kerala and falls under the Thiruvananthapuram railway division of the Southern Railway zone, Indian Railways. The station is served by several long-distance trains connecting most major cities in the country like Thiruvananthapuram, Kochi, Kozhikode, Mangalore, Bangalore, Coimbatore, Madurai, Chennai, Hyderabad, Tirupati, Visakhapatnam, Madgaon, Nagpur, Nagercoil, Pune, Bhopal, Ahmedabad, Kolkata, Guwahati, Mumbai and New Delhi.

History
The railway line between Trivandrum Central and  via Kottayam was converted to broad gauge in 1976.

Significance
Mavelikara railway station is the nearest rail station to pilgrimage places like Pandalam, Chettikulangara Devi Temple and Kandiyoor Sree Mahadeva Temple.

See also 

Ernakulam–Kottayam–Kayamkulam line

Kayamkulam

Thiruvananthapuram railway division

References

External links 

Railway stations in Alappuzha district
Railway stations opened in 1904